British Guiana (now Guyana)  competed at the 1956 Summer Olympics in Melbourne, Australia.

References
Official Olympic Reports

Nations at the 1956 Summer Olympics
1956 Summer Olympics
Sport in British Guiana
Summer Olympics